Cinéaste One Student Film Festival is an annual indie student film festival held in Karachi, Pakistan which previews new films of all genres, including documentaries, from Karachi. Founded in 2012, as a small festival to showcase the films prepared by students of Cinéaste One workshops. It evolved into Pakistan's pioneer indie film festival by premiering student films from  other institutes notably Indus Valley School of Art and Architecture, Iqra University, SAAMPT, SZABIST.

COSFF 2012

Cinéaste One organized a Cinema 101 Work Shop at AFK (Alliance Française Karachi). After the workshop was successfully completed, AFK agreed to publicly showcase the films coming out of the workshop. Cinéaste One Student Film Festival (COSFF) was produced; highlighting selected short films from workshop participants.

Featured Short Films

Reception
The first time filmmaker’s efforts were lauded and the affair was deemed a success.

COSFF 2013
Cinéaste One decided to capitalize on the previous years success. With an eye on cultivating the film scene, a bigger event was launched the following year. Cinéaste One Student Film Festival 2013 (COSFF13) assimilated Karachi’s major film schools:SAAMPT, SZABIST, Indus Valley School of Art and Architecture, Iqra University and Cinema 101 workshops, on a single platform, supporting upcoming filmmakers and fashioning a film culture. A film-rating system was developed and an external jury composed of foreign and local artists and filmmakers were assembled.

An indie-rock band opened the event and COSFF13 marked a celebration rewarding the best coming out of Karachi’s film schools.

See also
 Kara Film Festival

References

Film festivals in Pakistan
Pakistani film awards